Rear Admiral Joseph Bulloch Coghlan (9 December 1844 – 5 December 1908) was an officer in the United States Navy during the American Civil War and the Spanish–American War.

Biography
Born at Frankfort, Kentucky, to Cornelius and Lavinia, Coghlan graduated from the Naval Academy in 1863. He served in the sloop-of-war  during the Civil War.  As commander of the screw sloop , Coghlan was military commander of the Department of Alaska from 15 September 1883 to 13 September 1884. During the Spanish–American War he led the expedition which captured the batteries at Cavite (2 May 1898) and at Isla Grande, Subic Bay (7 July) and commanded the protected cruiser  during the Battle of Manila Bay on 1 May 1898.

He was promoted to rear admiral in 1902. He commanded American forces at Colón, Panama during the separation of Panama from Colombia in 1903.

He was a Companion of the Military Order of the Loyal Legion of the United States and the Military Order of Foreign Wars.

He died at New Rochelle, New York, and was buried at Arlington National Cemetery.

Namesakes
Two ships have been named  in his honor.

References

External links
 
 

1844 births
1908 deaths
United States Navy rear admirals
People of Kentucky in the American Civil War
American military personnel of the Spanish–American War
Commanders of the Department of Alaska
Burials at Arlington National Cemetery